Strychnos nux-vomica, the strychnine tree, also known as nux vomica, poison fruit, semen strychnos, and quaker buttons, is a deciduous tree native to India and to southeast Asia. It is a medium-sized tree in the family Loganiaceae that grows in open habitats. It is known for being the natural source of the extremely poisonous compound strychnine.

Description and properties 

Its trunk is short and thick. The wood is dense, hard, white, and close-grained. The branches are irregular and are covered with a smooth ashen bark. The young shoots are a deep green colour with a shiny coat. The leaves have an opposite decussate arrangement (each opposing pair of leaves at right angles to the next pair along the stem), are short stalked and oval shaped, have a shiny coat, and are smooth on both sides. The flowers are small with a pale green colour and a funnel shape. They bloom in the cold season and have a foul smell. The fruit are about the size of a large apple with a smooth and hard shell that when ripened is a mild shade of orange in colour. The flesh of the fruit is soft and white with a jelly-like pulp containing five seeds covered with a soft, woolly substance.

The seeds have the shape of a flattened disk completely covered with hairs radiating from the center of the sides. This gives the seeds a very characteristic sheen. The seeds are very hard, with a dark gray horny endosperm where the small embryo is housed that gives off no odor but possesses a very bitter taste.

Ecology 
The toxic fruit is eaten by monkeys and birds, such as the gray langur. It is also commonly eaten by hornbill species.

Toxicity 
It is a major source of the highly poisonous, intensely bitter alkaloids strychnine and brucine derived from the seeds inside the tree's round, green to orange fruit. The seeds contain approximately 1.5% strychnine, and the dried blossoms contain 1.0%. However, the tree's bark also contains brucine and other poisonous compounds.

Uses 
The strychnine-containing seeds have been used in arrow poison. The use of strychnine is highly regulated in many countries, and it is mostly used in baits to kill feral mammals. Most accidental poisoning is caused by breathing in the powder or by absorption through the skin. 

Strychnos is promoted within alternative medicine as a treatment for many conditions, but the claims are not supported by medical evidence.

Herbalism 

Strychnos is promoted within herbal medicine as being a treatment for a wide range of maladies, including cancer and heart disease. There is, however, no evidence it is useful for treating any condition. Indeed, these seeds contain strychnine. The plant appears on the Commission E list of unapproved herbs because it has not been proven to be safe or effective and thus is not recommended for use. Use of strychnine seeds for such purposes may prove fatal as strychnine is a highly toxic compound and has no safe limit for consumption.

In Ayurveda (the Indian system of Classical medicine), hudar is a mixture containing Strychnos nux-vomica. The seeds are first immersed in water for five days and then in milk for two days followed by their boiling in milk.
 

The level of toxic alkaloids in the unprocessed Strychnos seeds used in traditional medicines can be determined using established HPLC methods and HPLC-UV methods.

References 

Alternative medicine
Medicinal plants
nux-vomica
Plants described in 1753
Taxa named by Carl Linnaeus
Strychnine poisoning
Poisonous plants